The 2018–19 season was Juventus Football Club's 121st in existence and 12th consecutive season in the top-flight of Italian football.

On 10 July 2018, Cristiano Ronaldo became the highest ever transfer for an Italian club with his €100 million transfer from Real Madrid.

The season was the first since 2000–01 without Gianluigi Buffon, who joined Paris Saint-Germain (although he returned for the following season for a second and final spell).

Players

Squad information
Players and squad numbers last updated on 2 February 2019. Appearances include league matches only.Note: Flags indicate national team as has been defined under FIFA eligibility rules. Players may hold more than one non-FIFA nationality.

a. Additional costs of €16 million to be paid over the next two financial years.
b. Additional costs of €12 million to be paid.

Transfers

Summer 2018

In

Out

Other acquisitions

Other disposals

Total expenditure: €242,750,000

Total revenue: €93,500,000

Net income: €149,250,000

Winter 2018–19

In

Out

Other acquisitions

Other disposals

Total expenditure: €6,050,000

Total revenue: €56,950,000

Net income: €50,900,000

End of the season

Other acquisitions

Other disposals

Total expenditure: €216.000,000 (considered disposals only from July 2019)

Total revenue: €163.450,000 (considered disposals only from July 2019)

Net income: €52,550,000  (considered disposals only from July 2019)

Pre-season and friendlies

Competitions

Overall

Supercoppa Italiana

Serie A

League table

Results summary

Results by round

Matches

Coppa Italia

UEFA Champions League

Group stage

Knockout phase

Round of 16

Quarter-finals

Statistics

Appearances and goals

|-
! colspan=14 style=background:#DCDCDC; text-align:center| Goalkeepers

|-
! colspan=14 style=background:#DCDCDC; text-align:center| Defenders

|-
! colspan=14 style=background:#DCDCDC; text-align:center| Midfielders

|-
! colspan=14 style=background:#DCDCDC; text-align:center| Forwards

|-
! colspan=14 style=background:#DCDCDC; text-align:center| Players transferred out during the season

Goalscorers

Last updated: 26 May 2019

Disciplinary record

Last updated: 2 April 2019

Notes

A.  The match was called off at the 72nd minute due to the annual tradition of pitch invasion.

References

Juventus F.C. seasons
Juventus
Juventus
2018-19